Don't You Believe It! was an American radio program which aired in the late 1930s and early 1940s. The program, hosted by Alan Kent and later Tobe Reed, introduced unique facts along with debunking popular myths, followed by its tagline "Don't you believe it!" The program was sponsored by the Lorillard Tobacco Company, promoting "Sensation" cigarettes.

The droning tagline was referenced in cartoons such as the Warner Bros. Merrie Melodies short Bacall to Arms, Tom and Jerry in Mouse Trouble and The Missing Mouse, and Bugs Bunny in Big Top Bunny.

References

1930s American radio programs
1940s American radio programs
1930s neologisms
Catchphrases
Quotations from radio